The Burundi Swimming Federation, is the national governing body for the sport of swimming in Burundi.

References

National members of the African Swimming Confederation
Swimming
Swimming in Burundi
1994 establishments in Burundi
Sports organizations established in 1994